is a Japanese manga series written and illustrated by Megumi Morino. It started serialization in Kodansha's magazine Dessert in December 2017. As of January 2023, twelve tankōbon volumes have been released.

Publication
The series is written and illustrated by Megumi Morino. It premiered in the February 2018 issue of Dessert, which shipped on December 2, 2017. The first volume was released on May 11, 2018. As of January 2023, twelve tankōbon volumes have been released.

On March 8, 2020, Kodansha USA announced they would publish the series digitally. During their panel at Anime Expo 2022, Kodnasha USA announced that they would begin publishing the manga in print in Q2 2023.

Volume list

Reception
The series was a nominee for the 64th Shogakukan Manga Awards in the shōjo category. It was also the runner-up for the ninth An An manga award. In 2018, employees of one of the largest Japanese bookstores ranked the series as the tenth best manga of 2018. The series ranked fifteenth in the 2020 Kono Manga ga Sugoi! guidebook's top manga for female readers. Also in 2020, it was nominated for the Kodansha Manga Award in the shōjo category. In 2021, it won the Kodansha Manga Award in the shōjo category.

Rebecca Silverman from Anime News Network rated the first volume a C, praising the art and the character Hotaru, while criticizing Hananoi and their relationship, calling it "toxic".

References

External links
 Official website 
 

Kodansha manga
Romance anime and manga
School life in anime and manga
Winner of Kodansha Manga Award (Shōjo)